Benibad is a  village in Gaighat Block, Muzaffarpur district and a notified area in the Indian state of Bihar. It is located 28 37 km from Muzaffarpur city, situated at the bank of the river Baghmati and  national highway number 57, East- West expressway Bihar 76 m NE 26.146212,85.691085 google map. More than 20000 people are living here. Benibad is also famous for the Baghmati river which has given the villagers much sorrow through flooding and land erosion. Benibad though having a police post (Naka) comes under Giaghat Police Station which is nearly 3-4 kilometers away from the village towards Muzaffarpur on NH-57.

It also comes under Giaghat Assembly Constituency. Its head post office is Keotsa Baruari which is nearly 3-4 kilometers away from the village towards Darbhanga on NH-57. The village has an Urdu Medium Middle School, a Madrasa (Madrasa Qasmia) for religious education and a Primary School besides Water Ways Office, Petrol Pumps and a good market. The population is mixed but Muslims dominate in number. Educational & economic condition of the village is satisfactory.

For Worshipper in this village there is a large Temple and a Jama Masjid adjacent to each other which is also a sign of  Hindu-Mislims unity. The village has two other small mosques also. As has been mentioned above shopping facility is also available in this village as it has a good market and people from the adjoining villages come here to buy the goods of their daily life.

Villages in Muzaffarpur district